Hatteng is the administrative centre of Storfjord Municipality in Troms og Finnmark county, Norway.  The village is located along the European route E06 highway at the southern end of the Storfjorden, a branch of the large Lyngenfjorden.  Storfjord Church is located in Hatteng.

Immediately west of Hatteng lies the village of Oteren.

References

Villages in Troms
Storfjord